Revere High School is a public four-year high school in Revere, Massachusetts, United States, operated by the Revere Public Schools system, and serving about 1,500 students annually. High school students from the district  attend either Revere High, Seacoast Alternative School, or the Northeast Metropolitan Regional Vocational High School in Wakefield.

History
The current structure was opened in September, 1974.

A $2.2 million referendum passed around 1998 funded the installation of a new fire alarm system. In 1998 the roof of the building began leaking, and the Revere town government estimated that the repair would cost $1 million. The leak had the potential of destroying the new fire alarm system.

In 2011 the school expanded class times, with each class being 80 minutes instead of 54 minutes, and began a semester-based system. It also began using iPads for school purposes, with each student having an iPad. In 2016, the one-to-one iPad program was changed to a one-to-one Chromebook program. School officials cited the cost-effectiveness of the Chromebooks in comparison to iPads as a major deciding factor. The switch was received favorably, as the Chromebooks are equipped with keyboards and are less likely to malfunction.

In 2014 the National Center for Urban School Transformation designated Revere High School as "one of the Best Urban High Schools in America."

The "Newcomers' Academy" was established in 2013 to support the education of Students with Limited or Interrupted Formal Education (SLIFE). The program has succeeded in reducing the drop-out rate, as well as advancing students to a level at which they may be integrated into regular classes. In 2016, 88% of students enrolled in the academy successfully made the transition. That same year, Revere High School was recognized by the "Schools of Opportunity" project organized by the National Education Policy Center, with the academy being a distinguishing factor.

In December, 2018, "the Massachusetts School Building Authority announced its initial approval of the City’s bid for a new Revere High School."

Health center and contraception services
Revere High School's health center has birth control services, including contraceptives and the morning-after pill. The Massachusetts General Hospital operates this clinic. Students may use this clinic only if they have permission from their parents.

In 2009 groups of parents objected to these services. They started a petition to have a November 3, 2009 bill to eliminate these services. The voters in the city ultimately did not approve of the vote for removing the contraception services.

Student performance
In 2008 the rate of students attending tertiary education was 67% and the dropout rate was almost 9%. As of 2014, 80% of the school's graduates go to universities and colleges, and the school had a 3% dropout rate.

In 2009, the school had a graduation rate of 71.5%, which rose to 87.9% by 2017.

Extracurricular activities 
Among the Academic Extracurricular activities offered to Revere students are the Speech and Debate Team, who compete in the Massachusetts Forensics League, National Catholic Forensics League, and the National Forensics League, the Drama Guild, Model UN, Art Club, Book Club, Dance Team, ELL/Foreign Language Club, Friendship Club, Future Teachers Club, Gay Straight Alliance, Green Team/Community Service Club, Interact Club, Health & Fitness Club, Key Club, National Honor Society, North Shore Science League, Poetry Out Loud, Revere Culture Club, RHS Connect, RHS Newspaper, Robotics Club, Rock Ensemble, Stronghold Club, Technology Club and the Youth Empowerment Team.

Sports
Revere sponsors 16 Varsity sports: Baseball, Basketball (boys and girls), Cheerleading, Cross-country Track, Field Hockey, Football, Golf, Hockey, Indoor Track, Lacrosse (boys and girls), Soccer (boys and girls), Softball, Swimming, and Track. All teams competed in the Northeastern Conference of the Massachusetts Interscholastic Athletic Association until 2019, at which time all but the football team joined Everett, Malden, Medford, and Somerville in the Greater Boston League (GBL). The football team will join the GBL in 2020.

Football rivalry
Revere has a rivalry with neighboring Winthrop High School. The two teams play each other annually on Thanksgiving.

References

External links
 School website

Public high schools in Massachusetts
Revere, Massachusetts
Northeastern Conference
Schools in Suffolk County, Massachusetts